Monika Tyburska (born 27 May 1979) is a road cyclist from Poland. As a junior, Tyburska won the bronze medal at the 1997 junior track world championships in the individual pursuit. Tyburska represented Poland at the 2000 and 2001 UCI Road World Championships.

References

External links
 profile at Cyclingarchives.com

1979 births
Polish female cyclists
Living people
Place of birth missing (living people)
21st-century Polish women